The 1950 World Shotgun Championships was a competition held in Madrid, Spain. Carola Mandel of the United States became the first woman to ever win a world championship medal in shooting when she finished third in Madrid's Trap competition.

Medal count

Results

References 
 All WCH medallists (ISSF website)

ISSF_World_Shooting_Championships
Shooting
S
1950 in shooting sports
1950s in Madrid
Sports competitions in Madrid
Shooting competitions in Spain